The men's 100 metre freestyle S3 event at the 2008 Paralympic Games took place on September 7, at the Beijing National Aquatics Center.

Two heats were held, with five swimmers in the first heat and six swimmers in the second heat. The swimmers with the eight fastest times advanced to the final; there, they all competed in a single final heat to earn final placements.

Heats

Heat 1

Heat 2

Final

Swimming at the 2008 Summer Paralympics